James Brian Quinn (1928 – 28 August 2012) was an American academic and author. Quinn was a longtime professor at the Tuck School of Business and a proponent of knowledge management. He formulated the managerial concept of intelligent enterprise in 1992.

Biography 
Quinn was born in Memphis, Tennessee in 1928. He attended Yale University, where he obtained a Bachelor of Science degree in engineering in 1949. Quinn then obtained a master's degree in business administration from Harvard and a doctorate in philosophy from Columbia University.

In 1957, Quinn became a professor at the Tuck School of Business Administration, where he worked until his retirement in 1993. In the intervening years, Quinn created Tuck's curriculum for business policy and technology policy courses. He also formulated and taught several classes related to entrepreneurship; in doing so, Quinn became a progenitor for such type of class in American universities. He also served as Tuck's William and Josephine Buchanan Professor of Management Emeritus.

Quinn worked with the United States Commerce Department during the Chinese economic reform period in 1979, and later on served as a chair on the Clinton Administration's Academic Committee for Policy Review on Innovation and Productivity. In his 1992 work Intelligent Enterprise, Quinn formulated the concept of intelligent enterprise, an approach to management that applies technology and service paradigms to the challenge of improving business performance.

He was a three-time recipient of the McKinsey Award.

Quinn died on 28 August 2012 at the age of 84.

References 

1928 births
2012 deaths
American writers
Tuck School of Business faculty
Yale School of Engineering & Applied Science alumni
Columbia Graduate School of Arts and Sciences alumni
Harvard Business School alumni